DCKAP is an American and Indian firm with headquarters in Round Rock, Texas and a Development Center in Chennai, India. DCKAP was originally founded in 2005 by Karthik Chidambaram.

History
DCKAP was founded in Chicago, Illinois and Chennai, India in 2005. Two years later, it moved its headquarters to Fremont, California, and later to Round Rock Texas. In 2008, DCKAP set up an office in Chennai, India. 

In 2009, the company began working with Magento, Drupal, WordPress, and other open source technologies. Three years later, it entered the mobile apps market with new iOS applications such as HomeFly and Learn Alphabets & Numbers. In 2014, the firm moved into commerce, content development, and consulting. 

In 2022, DCKAP rebranded to a product company. Its products include DCKAP Integrator and DCKAP PIM.

Products and Services

DCKAP specializes in eCommerce development and helps build and maintain online shopping portals for international brands through leading platforms such as Adobe Commerce (Magento), Shopify, BigCommerce, SAP Hybris, and Salesforce Commerce.

Employees
Karthik Chidambaram is DCKAP's Founder and CEO. Before starting DCKAP in 2005, out of his apartment in Chicago, he worked as a consultant to the Fireman's Fund Insurance Company and IBM and as an Assistant Scientific Programmer for the Argonne National Laboratory in Argonne, Illinois.

Clients

DCKAP's clients include Midland Scientific, SRS Distribution FlowControlGroup, Vitabox, JS International, Steel & Pipes, Victor Distribtion Company, DDI, and many more.

References

Computer companies established in 2005
Companies based in Fremont, California
Providers of services to on-line companies
American companies established in 2005